On the morning of 17 September, Israel attacked targets in Syria. Syrian air defenses intercepted some of the missiles. The official news agency, SANA, reported that five Syrian soldiers were killed.

The attacks
The missiles were launched from the northeast of Lake Tiberias, targeting Damascus International Airport and some locations south of Damascus.

Reaction
The Palestinian movement Hamas condemned the Israeli attack, days after it issued a statement about continuing to restore relations with Syria, which were strained because of the movement's position on the events in that country.

See also
 July 2022 Damascus airstrikes
 Syria missile strikes (September 2018) (conducted on the same day)

References

2022 in the Syrian civil war
2022 airstrikes
September 2022 events in Asia
Airstrikes conducted by Israel
Israeli involvement in the Syrian civil war
September 2022 airstrikes